American singer and actress Becky G has received many awards and nominations throughout her career. She started her career in 2011 after posting several covers of popular rap songs, which gained the attention of producer Dr. Luke, who signed her to his record labels Kemosabe and RCA. After collaborating with Cody Simpson, Cher Lloyd and will.i.am in 2012, Gomez released her debut single "Becky From The Block", a cover of Jennifer Lopez's song in April 2013, with her debut EP Play It Again following in July. She saw success with the release of "Shower" in April 2014, which entered the top twenty of the Billboard Hot 100 chart and received a double platinum certification from the Recording Industry Association of America (RIAA), denoting two million units sold in the country. Following the success of "Shower", Gomez released "Can't Stop Dancin'" in November, "Lovin' So Hard" in February and "Break a Sweat" in August 2015, as singles from her then-forthcoming debut album. She embarked on a co-headlining tour with J Balvin throughout September and October of that year, spanning throughout the United States. She portrayed Valentina Galindo in two episodes of the musical television series Empire, contributing two new songs to the show's soundtrack.

Gomez decided to move to Spanish music in 2016, changing the course in her music career to the Latin music market. She released her first all-Spanish song in June, titled "Sola", followed by its sequel "Mangú" in October. In March 2017, she released "Todo cambió", which received two remixes. In July 2017, Gomez released her single "Mayores", with rapper Bad Bunny, which topped the charts in Spain, Ecuador, Chile and El Salvador, while reaching number three on the Billboard Hot Latin Songs chart. In April 2018, she released another hit single "Sin Pijama" with Dominican singer Natti Natasha, which also entered the top five of the Hot Latin Songs, peaked at number one in Spain and the top 10 in several countries. In July 2018, Gomez released "Zooted", featuring French Montana and Farruko, as her first English-language song in three years, and a month later released "Cuando Te Besé" with rapper Paulo Londra, which became the first song to top the Argentina Hot 100. The release of "LBD"  in February 2019 marked her official return to the English market, with songs such as "Green Light Go" and "Secrets" dropping during the year. In September, she was featured on the "Chicken Noodle Soup" cover/remix by South Korean rapper and dancer J-Hope of BTS. Gomez released her debut studio album Mala Santa on October 17. In 2021, she released the singles "Fulanito" with rapper El Alfa and "Ram Pam Pam" with Natasha. Gomez released "Mamiii", a collaboration with Karol G, in February 2022, which peaked at number 15 on the Billboard Hot 100, becoming her highest-charting song. Gomez released her second studio album Esquemas on May 13, which reached the top spot on the Billboard Latin Pop Albums chart. For her work on Christina Aguilera's studio album, Aguilera, as featured artist on "Pa Mis Muchachas", she was nominated for Album of the Year at the 23rd Annual Latin Grammy Awards.

In her musical career, Gomez has won one Billboard Latin Music Award, two American Music Awards, four Latin American Music Awards, two Lo Nuestro Awards, six Premios Juventud, as well as multiple nominations at the Latin Grammy Awards, Billboard Music Awards, and the MTV Europe and Video Music Awards.

Awards and nominations

Other accolades

Listicles

Notes

References

External links
 

G, Becky